= Sydney Eloise and the Palms =

US band

Sydney Eloise and the Palms are an American indie pop band from Atlanta, Georgia.

== History ==
Sydney Eloise and the Palms began in 2015 with the release of their debut full-length album titled Faces.

== Discography ==
Studio albums

- Faces (2015, The Cottage Recording Company and Bear Kit Recordings)
